The Howard Baldwin Trophy was presented annually to the World Hockey Association's coach of the year.

It was named in honour of New England Whalers co-founder Howard Baldwin. The trophy was renamed Robert Schmertz Memorial Trophy in 1974 in honour of Schmertz, an executive with the Whalers who died that year.

Winners
1973 – Jack Kelley, New England Whalers
1974 – Billy Harris, Toronto Toros
1975 – Sandy Hucul, Phoenix Roadrunners
1976 – Bobby Kromm, Winnipeg Jets
1977 – Bill Dineen, Houston Aeros
1978 – Bill Dineen, Houston Aeros
1979 – John Brophy, Birmingham Bulls

References

Bibliography

See also
World Hockey Association
List of WHA seasons

World Hockey Association trophies and awards